Penicillium cinnamopurpureum is a fungus species of the genus of Penicillium.

See also
List of Penicillium species

References

Further reading

 

cinnamopurpureum
Fungi described in 1959